Wongwian Yai station is a BTS skytrain station, on the Silom line in Khlong San District, Bangkok, Thailand. The station is on Krung Thon Buri Road to the west of Taksin intersection.

The station opened on 15 May 2009, together with Krung Thonburi station on the 2.2 kilometer Skytrain extension reaching Thonburi on the west bank of the Chao Phraya River.

See also
 BTS Skytrain
 Wongwian Yai
 MRT Purple Line
 SRT Dark Red Line

BTS Skytrain stations
MRT (Bangkok) stations
SRT Red Lines

ja:ウォンウィアン・ヤイ駅